Gimme Gimme Gimme is a British television sitcom, created and written by Jonathan Harvey, and produced by Tiger Aspect Productions, originally for BBC Two for its first two series, and then BBC One in its final series. The series stars Kathy Burke and James Dreyfus, with supporting cast including Beth Goddard, Brian Bovell, and Rosalind Knight.

Series overview

Episodes

Series 1 (1999)

Series 2 (1999–2000)

Comic Relief special (2001)

Series 3 (2001)

References

External links

BBC-related lists
Lists of British LGBT-related television series episodes
Lists of British sitcom episodes
Lists of sex comedy television series episodes